Voets is a surname. Notable people with the surname include: 

Margo Voets (born 1995), Belgian volleyball player
Peter Voets (born 1968), Belgian football player and manager
Robin Voets (born 2001), Dutch footballer
Sanne Voets (born 1986), Dutch Paralympic equestrian

See also
Voet